Jack Chamangwana (30 April 1957 – 6 May 2018) was a Malawian international footballer. He was nicknamed 'Africa' in Malawi and 'Black Stone' in South Africa.

He made his debut against Kenya in an international friendly match on 10 July 1975 and made his final appearance was 16 April 1985 against Mozambique in a 1986 African Cup of Nations qualification game.

He was involved in the 1978 FIFA World Cup qualification and 1986 FIFA World Cup qualification campaigns. He also played in the 1984 African Cup of Nations tournament for Malawi and the 1979, 1980, 1982 and 1983 editions of the CECAFA Cup.

Between 1986 and 1989, he played for South African club Kaizer Chiefs.

In 2007, he coached Tanzanian team Young Africans.

He died on 6 May 2018.

See also
List of men's footballers with 100 or more international caps

References 

1950s births
2018 deaths
Malawian footballers
Malawian expatriate footballers
Malawi international footballers
Mighty Wanderers FC players
Kaizer Chiefs F.C. players
Expatriate soccer players in South Africa
Malawian expatriate sportspeople in South Africa
1984 African Cup of Nations players
Association football defenders
People from Blantyre
FIFA Century Club